Sport, known by its full name as Hockey Team Vaasan Sport OY, is a Finnish ice hockey team playing in Liiga, and is based at Vaasa Arena (capacity 4448) in Vaasa. The team was established in 1939 as IF Sport (Idrottsföreningen Sport).

History
Vaasan Sport was founded in 1939 as IF Sport. The team was involved in the founding of the Finnish top division Liiga, formerly known as SM-Liiga, in 1975, but was relegated only one year later after the 1975-1976 season.

After the relegation, Sport played in the Finnish First Division (since then renamed to Mestis), until they were relegated in 1991-1992 to the Finnish Second Division. Climbing back up to the First division proved to be a tough task and wasn't accomplished until spring 1997, with the game-winning goal of the deciding game against Kiekko-67 being scored by Kari Teräväinen in overtime.

The 2008-09 season was a success as Sport won the Mestis championship. However, in the league qualification series the team lost the last game to Ässät in a best-of-7 format, thus remaining in Mestis. The overall qualification series were close as Sport at one point was a single goal away from beating Ässät in overtime and being promoted to Liiga, but was unable to score.

Sport struggled with bad economy during the 2000s, which almost led the club to bankruptcy. The club board made improvements to secure the future of the club, cutting down on the budget for the whole new season, as well as installing new head coach and former world ice hockey champion Antti Törmänen, who started to build a new young team from scratch. Eventually, the club surfaced from its financial struggles and went ahead to consistently fight for the championship victory again.

In 2014, during the 2013-2014 Mestis season, it was confirmed that Sport would be promoted to Liiga for the 2014-2015 season, regardless of the outcome of the ongoing championship. This was due to former Liiga team Jokerit transferring to KHL, leaving an open slot in the Finnish top division.

Supporters
The official fan club is called Red Army. The fan club Ultras 06 function as non-official supporters.

Players

Current roster

Retired numbers
# 29 Håkan Hjerpe
# 27 Tomi Väkelä
# 14 Sami Laaksoharju (not officially retired, but number has been off rotation after the death of Laaksoharju)

Notable alumni

  Chris Allen
  Matthieu Descoteaux
  Dale Dunbar
  Glen Gulutzan
  Tero Leinonen
  Ian MacNeil
  Oskar Osala
  David Saunders
  Janis Sprukts
  Juho-Tuomas Appel
  Vjačeslavs Fanduļs
  Oļegs Sorokins
  Toni Sihvonen

Notable coaches
  Juhani Tamminen
  Jukka Jalonen
  Kari Heikkilä

References

External links
  

Mestis teams
Vaasa
Sport in Vaasa
1939 establishments in Finland
1962 establishments in Finland
Liiga
Liiga teams